From Chaos is the sixth studio album by 311, released on June 19, 2001.

In 2000, before this album was recorded and released they left Capricorn Records and switched to Volcano Entertainment as their permanent label.

Singles from this album include "You Wouldn't Believe", "I'll Be Here Awhile", and "Amber". The latter was the most popular single from the album, and it still remains 311's most popular single to date.

From Chaos is the first album to ever be recorded in 311's current recording studio The Hive in North Hollywood, California.

From Chaos is an enhanced CD, featuring interviews with the band.

Shortly after the album was mixed, lead singer Nick Hexum had his tonsils removed.

"Bomb the Town," "Will the World," "We Do It Like This," and "Dreamland" are b-sides from this CD.  They can be heard on the bonus disc included with Enlarged to Show Detail 2.

Background
Much of the album From Chaos was written by the band while on tour in 2000 promoting their fifth studio album 'Soundsystem.' The album name 'From Chaos' was inspired by the band’s situation with their previous record label of seven years, Capricorn Records. According to singer Nick Hexum, they "had a lot of disagreements with Capricorn over the years and it was just time to end our relationship." The band sued Capricorn, voided their contract and signed with Volcano records. The band was going through stress of legal trouble, which brought a negativity environment where albums do not get made; they did not want to make an album surrounding that subject, so most of the album is born out of "relationships and appreciating life" according to Hexum, who takes pride in being up-beat and positive.

Critical reception

The album received positive reviews from various music critics. Steve Appleford of Los Angeles Times writes "[the album] "From Chaos" is mostly a repeat of proven 311 formulas (even with strange new flashes of prog-rock flavor), but singers Nicholas Hexum and S.A. Martinez are earnest, energetic MC's, crooning, rapping, shouting across a thundering blend of rock, reggae, hip-hop and psychedelia. Still fresh and funky." Angelique Campbell from Dayton Daily News in Ohio writes, "311 stays with its formula of combining funk, rock and reggae with a dash of catchy pop sensibility on From Chaos." Jacob Lunders, a contributor for Allmusic writes, "From Chaos astonishes and impresses with considerable energy and focus, proving itself as the album 311 has always been capable of making."

However, Paul Massari of The Boston Globe criticized the album, writing "311 tries to demonstrate that it is still relevant in the era of the loud, angry rap-metal band. The death-rock power chords on tracks like "Full Ride" are plodding, and the tone of the gangsta raps is absurdly inflated." Kathryn McGuire of Rolling Stone adds, "311 slings melodramatic metal riffs and whiny verses every which way, and their once-novel fusion seems unfocused and flat." Kristen Koba, founder of Popmatters.com wrote, "The whiny white boy rap, almost funky bass lines, and grinding guitar riffs just couldn’t hold up in a city that offers so much innovative hip-hop and truly vital rock."

Track listing

Personnel
Credits adapted from album’s liner notes.
311
 Nick Hexum – vocals , rhythm guitar, programming, additional engineering
 Chad Sexton – drums, percussion, programming, additional engineering
 SA Martinez – vocals , turntables
 Tim Mahoney – lead guitar
 Aaron "P-Nut" Wills – bass

Production
 311 – producer
 Ron Saint Germain – producer, engineer, mixing
 Alex Rivera – additional engineering, Hive Studio tech and engineer
 Mike Terry – tracking assistant
 Geoff Walcha – mixing assistant
 Scotch Ralston – technical assistance
 Joe Gastwirt – mastering
 Matt Hunter – Hive Studio drum tech
 Ruff Stewart – Hive Studio guitar tech

Charts

Album

Singles

Certifications

References

311 (band) albums
2001 albums
Volcano Entertainment albums
Albums produced by Ron Saint Germain